Wong Tai Sin is a station on the Hong Kong MTR . It is named after the Wong Tai Sin Temple, which is managed by Taoist organisation Sik Sik Yuen.

Livery
The station's livery is yellow to reflect the character "Wong" in Chinese, which means "yellow".

History 
Wong Tai Sin station was opened in the same time with Modified Initial System on 1 October 1979.

Station layout 
Platforms 1 and 2 share the same island platform.

Entrances/exits 

A/E: Lung Cheung Road (West Exit)
B1/B2: Lung Cheung Road (East Exit)
B3: Wong Tai Sin Temple, Temple Mall North 
C1: Ching Tak Street/Lung Cheung Road Junction
C2: Ching Tak Street 
D1: San Po Kong 
D2: Ching Tak Street, Bus Terminus
D3: Temple Mall South

Gallery

References 

MTR stations in Kowloon
Kwun Tong line
Railway stations in Hong Kong opened in 1979